The Gordon J. Laing Award is conferred annually, by the University of Chicago's Board of University Publications, on the faculty author, editor, or translator whose book has brought the greatest distinction to the list of the University of Chicago Press. The first award was given in 1963 and the most recent award was given on November 10, 2021, to Michael Rossi, Associate Professor of the History of Medicine, the Conceptual and Historical Studies of Science, and the College at the University of Chicago.

The award is named in honor of Gordon Jennings Laing, the scholar who, serving as general editor of the Press from 1909 until 1940, firmly established the character and reputation of the Press as the premier academic publisher in the United States.

The award is presented each spring at a ceremony at the Quadrangle Club (University of Chicago).

Recipients of the Gordon J. Laing Award 
 1963 Bernard Weinberg - A History of Literary Criticism in the Italian Renaissance
 1964 William Hardy McNeill - The Rise of the West: A History of the Human Community
 1965 Tang Tsou - America’s Failure in China, 1941-1950
 1966 A. Leo Oppenheim - Ancient Mesopotamia: Portrait of a Dead Civilization
 1967 Donald F. Lach - Asia in the Making of Europe, Volume 1, Books 1 and 2
 1968 Philip Foster - Education and Social Change in Ghana
 1969 Leonard B. Meyer - Music, the Arts, and Ideas: Patterns and Prediction in Twentieth-Century Culture
 1970 Gerald D. Suttles - The Social Order of the Slum: Ethnicity and Territory in the Inner City
 1971 Herrlee G. Creel - The Origins of Statecraft in China, Volume 1: The Western Chou Empire
 1972 Edward Wasiolek - The Notebooks of Dostoevsky (in five volumes)
 1973 Edward Shils - The Intellectuals and the Powers
 1974 Stuart M. Tave - Some Words of Jane Austen
 1975 Eric W. Cochrane - Florence in the Forgotten Centuries, 1527–1800: A History of Florence and the Florentines in the Age of the Grand Dukes
 1976 Keith Michael Baker - Condorcet: From Natural Philosophy to Social Mathematics
 1977 Marshall Sahlins - Culture and Practical Reason
 1978 Sewall Wright - Evolution and the Genetics of Populations, Volume 3: Experimental Results and Evolutionary Deductions
 1979 Alan Gewirth - Reason and Morality
 1980 Morris Janowitz - The Last Half Century: Societal Change and Politics in America
 1981 Wayne C. Booth - Critical Understanding: The Powers and Limits of Pluralism
 1982 James M. Gustafson - Ethics from a Theocentric Perspective, Volume 1: Theology and Ethics
 1983 Anthony C. Yu - The Journey to the West (in four volumes)
 1984 Richard Hellie - Slavery in Russia, 1450-1725
 1985 Paul Ricoeur - Time and Narrative, Volume 1
 1986 Mircea Eliade - A History of Religious Ideas (in three volumes)
 1987 Philip B. Kurland and Ralph Lerner - The Founders' Constitution (in five volumes)
 1988 David Grene - Herodotus: The History (translation)
 1989 S. Chandrasekhar - Truth and Beauty
 1990 Richard G. Klein - The Human Career: Human Biological and Cultural Origins
 1991 Leszek Kołakowski - Modernity on Endless Trial     
 1992 Jean Comaroff and John L. Comaroff - On Revelation and Revolution, Volume 1: Christianity, Colonialism, and Consciousness in South Africa
 1993 Gerald N. Rosenberg - The Hollow Hope: Can Courts Bring About Social Change?
 1994 David McNeill - Hand and Mind: What Gestures Reveal About Thought
 1995 Edward Laumann, Robert T. Michael, and Stuart Michaels - The Social Organization of Sexuality: Sexual Practices in the United States
 1996 W.J.T. Mitchell - Picture Theory: Essays on Verbal and Visual Representation
 1997 Marshall Sahlins - How "Natives" Think: About Captain Cook, For Example
 1998 Martin E. Marty - Modern American Religion (in three volumes)
 1999 André LaCocque & Paul Ricoeur - Thinking Biblically: Exegetical and Hermeneutical Studies
 2000 James Chandler - England in 1819: The Politics of Literary Culture and the Case of Romantic Historicism
 2001 François Furet - The Passing of an Illusion: The idea of Communism in the Twentieth Century
 2002 Bruce Lincoln - Theorizing Myth: Narrative, Ideology, and Scholarship
 2003 Robert J. Richards - The Romantic Conception of Life: Science and Philosophy in the Age of Goethe
 2004 Jonathan Hall - Hellenicity: Between Ethnicity and Culture
 2005 Bill Brown (critical theory) - A Sense of Things: The Object Matter of American Literature
 2006 W.J.T. Mitchell - What Do Pictures Want?: The Lives and Loves of Images
 2008 Philip Gossett - Divas and Scholars: Performing Italian Opera
 2009 Bernard Harcourt - Against Prediction: Profiling, Policing, and Punishing in an Actuarial Age
 2010 Martha Feldman - Opera and Sovereignty: Transforming Myths in Eighteenth-Century Italy
 2011 Robert J. Richards - The Tragic Sense of Life: Ernst Haeckel and the Struggle over Evolutionary Thought
 2012 Adrian Johns - Piracy: The Intellectual Property Wars from Gutenberg to Gates
 2013 Andreas Glaeser - Political Epistemics: The Secret Police, The Opposition, and the End of East German Socialism
 2014 Alison Winter - Memory: Fragments of a Modern History
 2015 Mauricio Tenorio-Trillo - I Speak of the City: Mexico City at the Turn of the Twentieth Century
 2016 Amir Sufi and Atif Mian - House of Debt: How They (and You) Caused the Great Recession, and How We Can Prevent It From Happening Again
 2017 David Nirenberg - Neighboring Faiths: Christianity, Islam and Judaism in the Middle Ages and Today
 2018 Forrest Stuart - Down, Out, & Under Arrest: Policing and Everyday Life in Skid Row
 2019 Deborah L. Nelson - Tough Enough: Arbus, Arendt, Didion, McCarthy, Sontag, Weil
 2020 Eve Ewing - Ghosts in the Schoolyard: Racism and School Closings on Chicago's South Side
 2021 Michael Rossi - The Republic of Color: Science, Perception, and the Making of Modern America

References

External links 
University of Chicago http://www.uchicago.edu/about/accolades/laing.shtml

University of Chicago Press http://www.press.uchicago.edu

University of Chicago
American literary awards